Rafael Village (formerly, Rafael) is a former unincorporated community now incorporated in Novato in Marin County, California. It lies at an elevation of 49 feet (15 m).

References

Neighborhoods in Marin County, California